Forrest classification is a classification of upper gastrointestinal hemorrhage used for purposes of comparison and in selecting patients for endoscopic treatment.

Forrest classification

Acute hemorrhage
 Forrest I a (Spurting hemorrhage)
 Forrest I b  (Oozing hemorrhage)

Signs of recent hemorrhage
 Forrest II a (Non bleeding Visible vessel)
 Forrest II b (Adherent clot)
 Forrest II c (Flat pigmented haematin (coffee ground base) on ulcer base)

Lesions without active bleeding
 Forrest III (Lesions without signs of recent hemorrhage or fibrin-covered clean ulcer base)

Application

Forrest's classification is instrumental when stratifying patients with upper gastrointestinal hemorrhage into high and low risk categories for mortality. It is also a significant method of prediction of the risk of rebleeding and very often is used for evaluation of the
endoscopic intervention modalities. A prospective controlled study revealed that "Forrest criteria are essential for proper planning of endoscopic therapy and urgent surgery in bleeding peptic ulcers".

History 
The classification was first published by J.A. Forrest, et al. in the Lancet in 1974.

See also
 Rockall score
 Glasgow-Blatchford

References

External links
 Illustrated Forrest classification
 Forrest Classification System with Respective Prognosis

Diagnostic gastroenterology